Hpa-An Stadium is a multi-purpose stadium, located in downtown Hpa-An, Myanmar. Hpa-An Stadium also hosts other local and regional football tournaments.

References

Football venues in Myanmar
Multi-purpose stadiums in Myanmar